Le Mec idéal is a 2011 Franco-Ivorian romantic comedy film directed by Owell A. Brown and produced by Ferdinand Esso for Icoast Movie. The film stars Emma Lohoues with Mike Danon, Serge Abessolo, Marie-Louise Asseu, Welcome Neba, and Therese Taba in supporting roles. The film is about Estelle, a highly successful hairdresser, but fails in relationships. In order to find happiness and a soulmate, her friends Nina and Rebecca organize a casting.

The film premiered at the 2011 FESPACO and was released in France on 22 November 2011. The film received positive reviews from critics. The film won the Stallion Bronze Award at PanAfrican Festival of Film and Television of Ouagadougou in 2011.

Cast
 Emma Lohoues as Estelle
 Mike Danon
 Serge Abessolo
 Marie-Louise Asseu
 Welcome Neba
 Therese Taba
 Kadhy Toure

References

External links 
 

Ivorian comedy films
2011 films
2011 romantic comedy films